Lidiya Mikhailovna Ivanova ( Samsonova, ; 7 April 1936, Moscow – 7 November 2007, Moscow) was a Russian print and television journalist, television announcer and writer.  She died of complications from diabetes on 7 November 2007.

Master of Sports in rowing, a member of the USSR national team.

References

External links
Lidia Ivanova, obituary 
Lidia Ivanova, biography

Soviet female rowers
Russian women writers
Russian women journalists
1936 births
2007 deaths
Russian television presenters
Deaths from diabetes
Place of birth missing
Place of death missing
Russian women television presenters
20th-century Russian journalists
20th-century Russian women